Dekel Keinan (born 15 September 1984) is an Israeli association footballer who plays as a central defender.

Early life
Keinan was born in Rosh HaNikra, Israel, to a family of Ashkenazi Jewish descent.

Club career

Maccabi Haifa
Keinan started his career with the Maccabi Haifa youth team. He made his first team debut in the 2002–03 season, making seven appearances. On 6 November 2003 he made his European debut in the second round of the 2003–04 UEFA Cup, a 0–0 draw with La Liga side Valencia.

In the 2004–05 season, he went on loan to fellow Israeli Premier League side Bnei Sakhnin, making 23 appearances and scoring five goals. The following season he joined Maccabi Netanya on loan, making 21 appearances and scoring two goals.

His first goal for Maccabi came in the 2007–08 Israeli Premier League season, a 3–0 win over Bnei Yehuda at the Bloomfield Stadium on 10 November 2007.

In the 2009–10 season he made eleven appearances in Maccabi's UEFA Champions League campaign as they reached the group stages.

Blackpool
On 12 July 2010, it was reported that Keinan had agreed a one-year contract with recently promoted Premier League club Blackpool, and that subject to a medical, he would join on a free transfer two days later. Blackpool chairman, Karl Oyston confirmed that the club had held discussions with Keinan and were hopeful of signing him, after a medical on 15 July. Five days later it was revealed that Keinan had passed the medical and that he was waiting on a work permit before he could link-up with the Blackpool squad in Devon where they were competing in the pre-season South West Challenge Cup tournament.

On 23 July, Blackpool manager Ian Holloway confirmed that Keinan was about to sign, after finally being granted a work permit, saying, "Dekel has got to fly to Tel Aviv to get his passport done. And he's got to do an English test, which he'll pass and I would fail. I think he's a quality lad and a good player. And I'm delighted to have someone with his experience.
" Over three weeks later on 16 August, Sky Sports News reported that Keinan had finally joined Blackpool, claiming that he had signed a two-year contract. Two days later he finally joined the Tangerines, on a one-year contract with an option for a further 12 months. Speaking about the move, Keinan said: "I'm looking forward to the first game and I'm very happy that everything is done. I just want to play for Blackpool and help this team. I had different offers but after I met the gaffer I was sure that I wanted to play for Blackpool."

His debut came on 21 August in the 6–0 defeat to Arsenal at the Emirates Stadium. After defender Ian Evatt was sent off in the 32nd minute, Keinan was then brought on to replace sacrificed midfielder Ludovic Sylvestre.

He made his full debut in the second round of the 2010–11 League Cup, a 4–3 defeat to Milton Keynes Dons at Stadium MK.

Cardiff City

Keinan joined Cardiff City, for an undisclosed fee, in January 2011. Keinan made his debut for Cardiff in a 1–0 away win against local rivals Swansea City. His first goal in English football came in a 2–2 draw with Barnsley on 13 March. Cardiff City had reached the play-offs, Cardiff were drawn against Reading, the first leg was 0–0 draw at Madjeski Stadium. During the return leg, Keinan pulled on Matthew Mills' shirt in which referee Howard Webb gave a penalty, Shane Long scored his second of the match from the penalty and Cardiff ended losing the match 3–0.

At the start of the 2011–12 season, Keinan found himself not in the starting eleven, being replaced by Anthony Gerrard who returned from his loan spell at Hull City. He got his first call up to the team on 23 August against Huddersfield Town in the League Cup. Keinan didn't find himself on the bench until a start against Leicester City, on 21 September. Due to a mass of injuries, Keinan found his first league appearance under Malky Mackay against Southampton a week later. On 21 November 2011, Keinan joined Crystal Palace on a six-week loan after finding himself far down the pecking order.

Keinan returned to Cardiff on 7 January, and found himself straight in the starting line up for the following game against West Bromwich Albion in the FA Cup, which was his 250th career appearance. However a lack of opportunities continued, which saw Keinan sent out on loan again, but this time to Severnside rivals, Bristol City until the end of the season.

Following his disappointing first full season in Cardiff, Keinan was left out of the squad to travel to Switzerland during the pre-season tour. Despite being left out of the pre-season, Keinan started the first game of the season against Northampton Town.

Return to Maccabi Haifa
On 18 September 2012, Keinan signed for his former club Maccabi Haifa following his release from Cardiff City.

FC Cincinnati
On 10 November 2017, the club FC Cincinnati of the United Soccer League, a second-division soccer league in the United States, announced that they had signed Keinan for the 2018 season.

Sacramento Republic
On 22 December 2018, Keinan signed with Sacramento Republic FC of the USL Championship.

Las Vegas Lights
On 15 September 2021, Keinan signed with USL Championship side Las Vegas Lights.

Club career statistics

Notes
a. All cup appearances for Maccabi Haifa included in 2009–10 total as specific season details not yet known
b. All European appearances for Maccabi Haifa details not known, therefore known total included only in totals

International career
Keinan, a full international for Israel, has also played at under-19 and under-21 levels.

He made his under-19 debut, two months after his 17th birthday, in a 2002 UEFA European Under-19 Football Championship qualifier on 30 November 2001, a 0–0 draw with Yugoslavia at the Herzliya Municipal Stadium. On 3 October 2002 he scored as Israel beat Azerbaijan 4–0 in a 2003 UEFA European Under-19 Football Championship qualifier. He made a total of eleven appearances at under-19 level, scoring one goal.

Keinan made his under-21 debut on 30 April 2003 in a 3–0 2004 UEFA European Under-21 Football Championship qualififier defeat to Cyprus. In June 2007 he was part of the Israel squad for the 2007 UEFA European Under-21 Football Championship finals, held in the Netherlands, playing in all three groups games.

He was the captain of the national team at the 2006 victory for her Valeri Lobanovsky Memorial Tournament.

He made his Israeli senior national team debut on 2 June 2007, in a 2–1 win over Macedonia, a UEFA Euro 2008 qualifying Group E game at the Skopje City Stadium. In 2008 and 2009 he made six appearances in qualifying for the 2010 FIFA World Cup.

Honours

Club
Maccabi Haifa
Israeli Premier League: 2003–04, 2008–09
Toto Cup: 2007–08
Israel State Cup: 2015–16

Notes

References

External links
Profile at maccabi-haifafc

1984 births
Living people
Israeli Ashkenazi Jews
Israeli footballers
Maccabi Haifa F.C. players
Bnei Sakhnin F.C. players
Maccabi Netanya F.C. players
Blackpool F.C. players
Cardiff City F.C. players
Crystal Palace F.C. players
Bristol City F.C. players
FC Cincinnati (2016–18) players
Sacramento Republic FC players
Las Vegas Lights FC players
Israeli Premier League players
Premier League players
English Football League players
USL Championship players
Israel international footballers
People from Rosh HaNikra
Footballers from Northern District (Israel)
Israeli expatriate footballers
Expatriate footballers in England
Expatriate soccer players in the United States
Israeli expatriate sportspeople in England
Israeli expatriate sportspeople in the United States
Israel under-21 international footballers
Israel youth international footballers
Israeli people of German-Jewish descent
Jewish footballers
Association football defenders